North West Stadium (currently known as the HT Pelatona Projects Stadium for sponsorship reasons) is a sports stadium in Welkom, South Africa. It is the home ground of the  who compete in the Currie Cup and Rugby Challenge rugby union competitions. The stadium is able to hold 8,500 people.

References

Rugby union stadiums in South Africa
Multi-purpose stadiums in South Africa
Sports venues in the Free State (province)
Matjhabeng Local Municipality